The Biblioteca Oliveriana is a public library located in the Palazzo Almerici on via Mazza in the town of Pesaro, region of Marche, Italy.

History
In 1756, Annibale degli Abati Olivieri (1708–1789), an aristocrat without heirs, donated his collection of antiquities, including medals and ancient coins, and his book collection to the city, to form the nucleus of the present Oliveriana Library. In 1787, the collection was enhanced by the collections of Giovanni Battista Passeri (1694–1780).

The library and the adjacent archaeological museum (see Museo Oliveriano entry) had their first accommodation in Piazzetta San Giacomo (today Piazza Olivieri) on the ground floor of the eighteenth-century Palazzo Olivieri, designed by the architect and painter Giovanni Andrea Lazzarini; the library was inaugurated on May 2, 1793. On July 31, 1892, the collections were moved to their present location in the Palazzo Almerici.

The three reading rooms are respectively called Olivieri, Passeri, and Perticari. The first houses the white Carrara marble bust of Olivieri, sculpted by Sebastian Pantanelli in 1791–92; the second houses a portrait of the archaeologist Passeri; and the third houses part of the library of the illustrious scholar and linguist Giulio Perticari (1779–1822).

In his will, Olivieri stated:
Where reigns idleness and ignorance there can be no morality. May it therefore be that the income you will derive from my goods will serve to make my fellow citizens cultivated and industrious.

Furthermore, he wished that the foundation lead to the provision in Pesaro of "Masters of Science, chosen in accordance to the times and agreeable to the needs, the abilities, and inclinations of citizens ... without giving these chairs to a specific religious community" and that the directors "consider specially the study of Law and Medicine ... and promote the study of painting, sculpture and architecture" and "introduce into Pesaro any new art".

The library contains over 400 incunabula, including the Hypnerotomachia Poliphili printed by Aldus Manutius in 1499 in Venice and the Varia carmina by Sebastian Brant printed by Johann Bergmann in 1498 in Basel. A full catalogue is available.

References

Infrastructure completed in 1791
Libraries in Pesaro
Libraries established in 1756